Houses of the Holy is the fifth studio album by Led Zeppelin.

Houses of the Holy may also refer to:
"Houses of the Holy" (song), a song by Led Zeppelin from Physical Graffiti
"Houses of the Holy" (Supernatural), an episode of Supernatural